Gravel is a 2018 racing video game developed by Milestone srl and published by Milestone and Square Enix for Microsoft Windows, PlayStation 4 and Xbox One.  MacOS and Linux ports by Virtual Programming were released in January 2019.

Gameplay
The game revolves around competing in a racing television program called Off-Road Masters. Each player must earn stars to move on to the next challenge.

Reception

Gravel has received mixed reviews since its release. Eurogamer Italy opined that Gravel is challenging and entertaining, but "not enough to compete with the best titles in the genre". Review aggregation site Metacritic gave the PlayStation 4 version an average rating of 67 out of 100 based on reviews from 30 critics.

References

External links
 

2018 video games
Off-road racing video games
Unreal Engine games
Milestone srl games
Video games set in Portugal
Video games set in Alaska
Video games set in Australia
Video games set in Florida
Video games set in Namibia
Square Enix games
PlayStation 4 games
Video games developed in Italy
Windows games
Xbox One games